The Women's 4 × 100 metre medley relay competition of the 2019 African Games was held on 24 August 2019.

Records
Prior to the competition, the existing world and championship records were as follows.

Results

Final
The final was started on 24 August.

References

Women's 4 x 100 metre medley relay
2019 in women's swimming